is a Japanese novelist.

Biography
He was born in Sasebo, Nagasaki. He graduated from Sasebo North High School, and dropped out from Hokkaido University Department of Literature. While studying at university, he was impressed after reading Isahaya Shōbu Nikki (1977) by the writer Kuninobu Noro, and started writing novels when he got a reply by writing a fan letter. In 1979 he went back to Sasebo after leaving the university, won the Subaru Literary Award for his long-awaited novel  written in 1983 for two years, and debuted as a writer. He made his pen name  because he said that he heard the sound of a siren from a fire department in Sasebo City ringing at noon in the age of amateurs and coming up with the custom of starting to write novels.

His other representative works include Revolver (1985), Kojin Kyōju (1988, Yamamoto Shūgorō Prize nominate), Kanojo ni tsuite Shiru koto no subete (1995), Y (1998), Jump (2000), Minoue Banashi (2009), etc., in which Y an Jump were bestsellers. In 2015, he won the Futaro Yamada Award for Hato no Gekitai-hō. In 2017, he later won the 157th Naoki Prize for Tsuki no Michi Kake.

Bicycle racing has been his long-standing hobby, and several works were on the subject of bicycle racing, such as Eien no 1/2, his short story Kimi wa Gokai shite iru, his column collection on bicycle racing side B, etc., were also published.

Bibliography

Novels

Featured

Short stories

Essays, others

Anthologies
Works by Shogo Sato are inside quotation marks ("")

Imaging works
 Films

 TV dramas

References

External links
 – Official homepage. Archived on 17 February 2014. 

Japanese novelists
Naoki Prize winners
People from Sasebo
Writers from Nagasaki Prefecture
1955 births
Living people